Mohammad Reza Entezari (Persian: محمد رضا انتظاری, born 31 July 1946) is a retired Iranian runner. He specialized in the 400 m and 800 m distances, in which he won two silver and one bronze medals at the 1974 Asian Games. He competed in the 400 m at the 1972 Summer Olympics and in the 800 m at the 1976 Summer Olympics, but failed to reach the finals.

References

Iranian male sprinters
Iranian male middle-distance runners
Athletes (track and field) at the 1974 Asian Games
1946 births
Living people
Medalists at the 1974 Asian Games
Asian Games silver medalists for Iran
Asian Games bronze medalists for Iran
Olympic athletes of Iran
Athletes (track and field) at the 1972 Summer Olympics
Athletes (track and field) at the 1976 Summer Olympics
Asian Games medalists in athletics (track and field)
20th-century Iranian people